A lucibufagin is a defensive steroid produced by several species of firefly to make them unpalatable to predators such as spiders and birds. Certain species of firefly that do not themselves produce lucibufagins have been observed to eat other species of firefly that do produce the steroid to gain the defensive properties for themselves. The lucibufagins are a set of three related compounds (Lucibufagin A, B, and C), and are in the same structural class as the bufadienolides.

References 

Steroids
2-Pyrones